Kalpan Paropkari is a former One Day International cricketer who represented India. She played three One Day Internationals. She scored 23 runs at an average of 7.66.

References

Living people
Indian women cricketers
India women One Day International cricketers
Year of birth missing (living people)